Trevor Thomson (born 27 July 1998) is a British sprint canoeist.

In 2016 he won medals at the World Junior and European Junior Championships in the K-2 200m discipline. He made his senior championship debut at the 2018 European Championships in the K-4 500m discipline.

References

Living people
1998 births
British male canoeists